Camilo Andrés Machado (born 1 February 1999) is a Colombian professional footballer who plays as a winger for Quilmes.

Career
Machado's senior career started with Quilmes, having joined the club's academy in 2016 after stints in the systems of Talento Ciudadela in his homeland and in Argentina with All Boys. After going unused on the substitutes bench for Primera B Nacional fixtures with Arsenal de Sarandí and Gimnasia y Esgrima in November 2018, he made his bow in professional football during a draw with Santamarina on 2 December.

Career statistics
.

References

External links

1999 births
Living people
Colombian footballers
Colombian expatriate footballers
People from Santa Marta
Association football wingers
Sportspeople from Magdalena Department
Primera Nacional players
Quilmes Atlético Club footballers
Argentino de Quilmes players
Expatriate footballers in Argentina
Colombian expatriate sportspeople in Argentina